David Martin Herrington is a British-born director of photography, noted for his work in advertising, film and TV. He graduated from the London School of Technology and began his career as a cinematographer as an apprentice while working for the Rank Organization in London, England. He emigrated to Toronto, Ontario, Canada, and joined the staff of Film House to become chief timer and technical director before deciding to follow his passion of becoming a director of photography.

Herrington now lives in Los Angeles where he has worked on commercials for Dodge, Lincoln, Mercury, Toyota, McDonald's, Hallmark, Sony, Sears, Coca-Cola and AT&T.

He has been nominated and won numerous awards for his commercials including a Bronze Lion (Cannes Film Festival), and several Bessie Awards (Canadian Advertising Awards). In 1995, Herrington received a coveted Commercial CSC award for his work on Frigidaire's I Am a Chef.

During shooting of a commercial with John Landis, Herrington was asked to film Blues Brothers 2000. He went on to film many TV and theatrical projects, including 1-800-Missing for three seasons, and Shoot 'Em Up for Peter Pau and Michael Davis.

Filmography

References

External links
 David Herrington
 

Living people
Year of birth missing (living people)
English cinematographers